The 2013 season of the Belgian Football League (BFL) is the regular season played in the Belgium. The championship game is the Belgian Bowl XXVI.

Regular season

Regular season standings
W = Wins, L = Losses, T = Ties, PCT = Winning Percentage, PF= Points For, PA = Points Against

 – clinched playoff berth

Post season

References

American football in Belgium
BFL
BFL